the Judo competitions at the 2017 Games of the Small States of Europe were held at the Acquaviva School Gym in Acquaviva, San Marino on 31 May and 2 June 2017.

Medal table

Medalists

Men

Women

References

External links
 
 Official results
 Results book

European Games, Small States
2017 Games of the Small States of Europe
2017
Judo competitions in San Marino